The Battle Creek Revolution was a professional ice hockey team which played in the All American Hockey League. The team played its home games at Revolution Arena in Battle Creek, Michigan. The team was initially announced to play in the Mid-Atlantic Hockey League for the 2008–09 season before the league folded in August 2008.

The organization also created a junior hockey team called the Battle Creek Jr. Revolution that played its first season in the North American 3 Hockey League in the 2010–11 season.

Season-by-season results

2010–11 roster

References

External links
Official Battle Creek Revolution website
Official AAHL website

All American Hockey League (2008–2011) teams
Professional ice hockey teams in Michigan
Sports in Battle Creek, Michigan